Trisha Paytas (born May 8, 1988) is an American YouTuber and singer. Her YouTube channel consists of a wide variety of content including lifestyle-oriented vlogs, music videos, and mukbangs. As of July 2022, she has accumulated roughly 5 million subscribers and 1 billion lifetime views. Paytas has co-hosted Frenemies with fellow YouTuber Ethan Klein. Additionally, she has worked independently as a singer, releasing several records and singles, and appeared in television shows and films.

Early life
Paytas was born on May 8, 1988, in Riverside, California before moving to Illinois. She has two siblings; an older brother and a younger, maternal half-sister. At 15, Paytas moved from Illinois back to California and was enrolled in a Catholic online school program. She returned to Illinois to live with her mother at age 16, attending high school in Pecatonica, Illinois.

Career

2006–2012: Beginnings on YouTube
After moving to Los Angeles to pursue acting, Paytas began doing professional lingerie modeling and worked as a stripper and an escort to support herself. She was featured on various television shows, attempting and failing to break the fastest-talker record on Guinness World Records Unleashed, and appearing on The Greg Behrendt Show and in Who Wants to Be a Superhero?.

Paytas registered her YouTube channel in 2007. It was originally dedicated to movie director Quentin Tarantino, whom Paytas idolized, but soon after being created, Paytas began to focus on other types of videos. On the channel, Paytas primarily gives fashion, beauty, and relationship advice.

In 2010, Paytas appeared in an episode of My Strange Addiction as a self-admitted tanning addict, despite being aware of the high chances of developing skin cancer, among others. Paytas appeared in several music videos by various artists including Eminem, Amy Winehouse, and The All-American Rejects.

2013–2017: Online success and music releases
From 2013 to 2017, Paytas made a number of trolling videos, which she told Business Insider were a way to "dumb myself down" in order to get more attention and views. This involved videos claiming that dogs do not have brains, or that she was voting for the 2012 Republican candidate for President of the United States, Mitt Romney. In 2014, Paytas began posting widely-viewed mukbang sessions and eating-challenge videos. In September 2014, Paytas competed in an episode of the television game show Celebrity Name Game, along with her mother.

In 2015, the video for her song, "Fat Chicks" was featured on websites such as Cosmopolitan, The Huffington Post, and Business Insider. In 2016, her EP Daddy Issues appeared on the Billboard Top Heatseekers albums chart, debuting at number 25.

In 2017, Paytas became a housemate on Celebrity Big Brother 20. She left the show after 11 days of participation and proceeded to make disparaging comments about fellow participants, including accusations of drug use.

2018–present: Concert tour and Frenemies
In 2019, Paytas embarked on her own headlining tour, The Heartbreak Tour, to promote her music.

In September 2020, Paytas started the YouTube podcast Frenemies with fellow YouTuber Ethan Klein. The show discussed recent events in the social media world. Paytas and Klein were cohosts on Frenemies until June 2021, when Paytas left Frenemies, and the show ended.

, Paytas has expanded her social media presence to the subscription website OnlyFans.

Personal life
Paytas has had several public long-term relationships. She dated American YouTuber Jason Nash from 2017 to 2019. In 2020, she started dating Israeli artist Moses Hacmon. The pair got engaged that same year and married in 2021. In February 2022, Paytas announced that she was expecting her first child with Hacmon. She had previously been told by her doctors that she would not be able to conceive a child naturally. In September 2022, Paytas addressed false online rumors claiming that she had already given birth and that the baby was the reincarnation of Elizabeth II. That same month, she gave birth to a daughter, naming her Malibu Barbie. Paytas has identified with different religious beliefs throughout her life, mainly Roman Catholicism.

Paytas has suffered from mental health problems, having been diagnosed with borderline personality disorder. In an interview on the H3 Podcast, Paytas stated she used to have substance abuse problems and was once hospitalized after a methamphetamine overdose. Paytas has stated that her main addiction was to prescription pills.

In October 2019, Paytas came out as a trans man online, but denied wanting to change her pronouns. She received criticism for this due to having previously self-identified as a chicken nugget, ostensibly in a facetious manner. In a March 2021 interview, she said that when she came out as transgender in 2019, she "didn't have the vocabulary to describe it at the time." In April 2021, Paytas released a video on her main YouTube channel, in which she discussed her previous gender confusion and reaffirmed her non-binary identity. She has since updated her pronouns to she/they.

Filmography

Film

Television
{| class="wikitable sortable"
! Year
! Title
! Role
! class="unsortable" | Notes
|-
| 2006
| The Greg Behrendt Show
| Herself; Correspondent
| 13 episodes
|-
| rowspan="2"| 2007
| The Next Best Thing
| Herself
| Contestant
|-
|  Who Wants to Be a Superhero
| Herself; Ms. Limelight
| Contestant; 7th Place, 4 episodes
|-
| 2008
| The Price Is Right
| Herself
| Contestant
|-
| rowspan="4"| 2010
| My Strange Addiction
| Herself
| Pilot
|-
| Supreme Court of Comedy
| Herself
| Episode: "Kevin Nealon vs. Jamie Kennedy"
|-
| Tim and Eric Awesome Show, Great Job!
| Eric's Date
| Episode: "Lucky"
|-
| The Ultimate Man
| Tracy
| 3 episodes
|-
| rowspan="8"| 2011
| Ellen
| Herself; Guest
| Season 8, Episode 99
|-
| Jackass Parody: Inception
| Steve-O's Fantasy Girl
| Critics Choice Awards Special
|-
| The Car Show
| Modified Girl
| Episode: "Blast from the Past and Look Into the Future"
|-
| Conan
| Football Player
| Episode: "Return to Devil's Condo"
|-
| Modern Family
| Plastic Surgery Girl
| Episode: "Go Bullfrogs!"
|-
| Who Wants to Date a Comedian?
| Herself 
| Contestant; Episode: "Greg Wilson"
|-
| Judge Alex
| Herself; Defendant
| Episode: "Metz vs Paytas"
|-
| The Millionaire Matchmaker
| Herself 
| Contestant; Episode: "The Young and the Loveless"
|-
| rowspan="3"| 2012
| 1000 Ways to Die
| Herself; Former Hooters Waitress
| Episode: "Die-Abestic"
|-
| America's Got Talent
| Herself
| Contestant; Season 7, Episode 10
|-
| Tosh.0
| Herself
| Cameo; Episode: "Hurl-a-Whirl (Regurgitation)"
|-
| rowspan="8"| 2013
| Dr. Phil
| Herself; Guest
| Season 11, Episode 84
|-
| Nathan for You
| Herself
| Season 1, Episode 3
|-
| Walk of Shame
| Sally
| Episode: "When Harry Held Sally"
|-
| Family Tree
| Extreme Character
| Episode: "The Box"
|-
| Double Divas
| Herself
| Episode: "Rhythm & Boobs"
|-
| Guinness World Records Gone Wild
| Herself
| Contestant; Speed Reader
|-
| Good Morning America
| Herself; Commentator 
| November 7, 2013
|-
| Today
| Herself; Whether Girl
| November 7, 2013
|-
| rowspan="2"| 2014
| Ridiculousness
| Herself
| Cameo; Season 4, Episode 6
|-
| Celebrity Name Game
| Herself
| Contestant; Season 1, Episode 2
|-
| 2016
| To Tell the Truth
| Herself
| Contestant
|-
| 2017
|  Celebrity Big Brother UK 20
| Herself; Housemate
| 13th Place (11 Episodes)
|-
| rowspan="2"| 2018
| The Real Housewives of Beverly Hills
| Herself
| Cameo; Episode: "Lights Out!"
|-
| Access Hollywood
| Herself; Guest
| February 7, 2018
|-
| 2019
| The Doctors
| Herself; Guest
| Season 12, Episode 29
|}

Music videos

Discography
 Fat Chicks (2015)
 Superficial Bitch (2015)
 Daddy Issues (2016)
 Showtime (2016)
 Warrior (2016)
 Chicken Fingers and Lipo (2017)
 Chicken Parm and Heartbreak (2018)
 Songs From My Kitchen Floor (2019)
 Rebirth (2019)

 Published works 

 Paytas, Trisha. The History of My Insanity CreateSpace, 2013.
 Paytas, Trisha. Tease CreateSpace, 2014.
 Paytas, Trisha. Curvy and Loving it CreateSpace, 2014.
 Paytas, Trisha. Trisha's 31 Nights of Fright CreateSpace, 2014.
 Paytas, Trisha. 101 Poems About My Ex-Boyfriend'' Independent, 2019.

Notes

References

External links

Living people
1988 births
American erotic dancers
American film actors
American non-binary actors
Freeport High School (Illinois) alumni
Participants in American reality television series
People from Pecatonica, Illinois
People from Riverside, California
People with borderline personality disorder
American YouTubers
Catholics from Illinois
YouTube vloggers
LGBT YouTubers
Non-binary musicians
LGBT Roman Catholics
LGBT people from California
LGBT people from Illinois
20th-century LGBT people
21st-century LGBT people